Horné Turovce is a village and municipality in the Levice District in the Nitra Region of Slovakia.

History
In historical records the village was first mentioned in 1156.

Geography
The village lies at an altitude of 143 metres and covers an area of 12.969 km2. It has a population of about 595 people.

Ethnicity
The village is approximately 68% Magyar and 31% Slovak with a 1% Gypsy and Czech minority.

Facilities
The village has a public library and a football pitch.

Genealogical resources

The records for genealogical research are available at the state archive "Statny Archiv in Banska Bystrica, Nitra, Slovakia"

 Roman Catholic church records (births/marriages/deaths): 1752-1895 (parish A)

See also
 List of municipalities and towns in Slovakia

External links
https://web.archive.org/web/20070513023228/http://www.statistics.sk/mosmis/eng/run.html
Surnames of living people in Horne Turovce

Villages and municipalities in Levice District